Bard Ventures Ltd. was a Canadian mining and exploration company headquartered in Vancouver. The company conducted exploratory drilling to assess mineral rights within the Lone Pine Molybdenum Property outside of Houston, British Columbia, specifically focusing on molybdenum. The company has also held interests in several other projects, including a 50% interest in the Wasi Creek Zinc Lead Silver Project, outside of Mackenzie, British Columbia.

History

The Lone Pine property has seen extensive historical exploration. A Minister of Mines and Resources (Canada) annual report from 1914 was the first mention of workings on the property, detailing a shaft intersection of a narrow silver-lead-zinc-copper-gold bearing quartz vein. Various surface workings continued in the 1920s as additional veins were discovered.

Numerous companies from 1959 to 1971 conducted a variety of exploration over the property, however, it wasn't until 1976 that molybdenum mineralization was being sought after as a primary commodity. Between 1976 and 1992 continued exploration resulted in moderate molybdenum mineralization on the property.

The Lone Pine Property consists of seven mineral claims covering 1051 hectares, which are approximately 15 kilometers north-northwest of Houston, BC, and are situated in the Omineca Mining Division. The Property area extends over several molybdenum showings including Quartz Breccia, Alaskite Zone, Mineral Hill and Granby.

The Alaskite Zone is aptly named for the white, fine to medium grained quartz feldspar porphyry intrusive that was recognized and mapped in outcrop in 1967 as alaskite. The alaskite intrusive is the main focus of the Lone Pine Property drilling and has been interpreted as being the most favorable lithology for molybdenum mineralization. The alaskite intrusive to date continues to be drilled to the northwest of its original outcropping occurrence, BD-07-01 area, with exploration advancement to the northwest ongoing.

Mining operations and community

Bard Ventures drilling program for the Lone Pine Property provides employment for the surrounding communities of Smithers, British Columbia and Houston. Commercial production will not interfere with the local communities as the property has access to an existing infrastructure and is located less than one kilometre off Highway 16 that connects Prince Rupert to Prince George in central BC.

The main power grid connecting the area transects the property along Highway 16. In addition, a power sub station occurs within two kilometres of the property, opening the potential for simple, low-cost power for the project. Surface rights in the area are controlled by a few (less than five) local residents that have thus far been cooperative with the exploration efforts. Also transacting the property is a natural gas pipeline. Natural gas is an important component used to drive energy for a Mo roaster facility, should the project ever warrant the development of one.

Demand for molybdenum
According to the International Molybdenum Association , demand from the manufacturing of tools, high-speed steel, stainless steel and low alloy steel accounts for about 80% of total molybdenum consumption. Demand for molybdenum has also increased because of its use as a reducer of sulfur in crude oil. One of the applications pertinent in current market conditions is the use of molybdenum in the pipework for the offshore oil and gas industry. High growth in the energy sector has contributed to the growth in global demand of molybdenum, due to increased demand for the metal for new and replacement pipelines. However, an analyst from Fundamental Research Corp. says: "The recent decline in energy prices and global steel consumption will put downward pressure on molybdenum demand growth." 

Other mining companies in the molybdenum industry are Thompson Creek Metals Company Inc., General Moly, Inc. and Roca Mines Inc.

References

Junior Mining Weekly, July 16, 2008, Canaccord Adams

External links

 International Molybdenum Association
 Current Price of Molybdenum Chart

Companies listed on the TSX Venture Exchange
Mining companies of Canada